Výrovice is a municipality and village in Znojmo District in the South Moravian Region of the Czech Republic. It has about 200 inhabitants.

History
The first written mention of Výrovice is in a deed of King Wenceslaus II from 1299.

References

Villages in Znojmo District